Cape Coral High School is located in Cape Coral, Florida. It is one of six high schools in the city of Cape Coral and is also a part of the Lee County School District system.

As of the 2020-2021 school year, the school had an enrollment of 1,602 students and 81 classroom teachers (on a FTE basis.)

Awards and recognition 
During the 1988–89 school year, Cape Coral High School was recognized with the Blue Ribbon School Award of Excellence by the United States Department of Education, the highest award an American school can receive from the department.<ref>Viers Mill School Wins Blue Ribbon; School Scored High on Statewide Test; The Washington Post. September 29, 2005 "For their accomplishments, all three schools this month earned the status of Blue Ribbon School, the highest honor the U.S. Education Department can bestow upon a school."</ref>

In 1996, Cape Coral High School's newspaper The BBC won the NSPA's high school newspaper competition in Orlando, Florida. It went on to rank 8th nationally. In 1997, The Shell repeated its win for the state of Florida. The paper, now known as The Seahawk's Eye, won a first place award from Autism Speaks during the 2008–2009 school year. It has also won first place from the National Asperger Association during both the 2009 and 2010 school years.

In spring 2006, the school was one of 17 in Florida selected as part of Sports Illustrated'''s "model SI Schools steroid and drug prevention initiative" for high school athletes.

In April 2007 the school was awarded accreditation by the International Baccalaureate Organization to offer the IB Diploma Programme, making it the second IB school in Lee County and putting the school on track to graduate its first special needs class in 2009.

Achievements 

The Cape Coral High School soccer team won the Class 4A State Soccer Championship 2010–2011.

Major incidents 
In 2013, a human fetus was discovered in a mason jar at the school.

In 2019, for the first time a school shooting threat was made. The threat was written on a bathroom stall using a permanent marker, stating "school shooting soon, ha ha ha ha". A young boy was shortly arrested upon suspicion of being behind the threat.

Athletics 
Cape Coral High School offers a variety of athletic programs for students during the fall, winter and spring. Sports offered include:

 Baseball
 Basketball
 Bowling
 Cross Country
 Cheerleading
 Diving
 Football
 Golf
 Wrestling
 Soccer
 Softball
 Swimming
 Tennis
 Track
 Volleyball

Teaching staff

Florida Comprehensive Assessment Test (FCAT) 
The Florida Department of Education "graded" Cape Coral High School with a "B" in the 2019-2020 school year. For the previous school year, the school received a "B".

The state uses "school grades" to measure the overall performance of schools in Florida on the Florida Comprehensive Assessment Test. The grades (A-F) are based on three criteria: overall performance on FCAT, percentage of eligible students who took the test, and whether or not students made progress in reading and math.
In 2007–2008 school year, Cape Coral High School scored an "F".

Student body

References

External links 
 Official school website
 Cape Coral High at greatschools.net

High schools in Lee County, Florida
Public high schools in Florida
Cape Coral, Florida
1987 establishments in Florida
Educational institutions established in 1987